Bankin'ny Tantsaha Mpamokatra Antananarivo is a Malagasy football club based in Antananarivo, Madagascar. The team has won the THB Champions League in 1986, qualifying them for the 1987 African Cup of Champions Clubs.

The team currently plays in the Malagasy Second Division.

Achievements
THB Champions League: 2
1986

Performance in CAF competitions
CAF Champions League: 1 appearance
1987 African Cup of Champions Clubs - first round

References

External links

Football clubs in Madagascar
Antananarivo